Lukov is a market town in Znojmo District in the South Moravian Region of the Czech Republic. It has about 300 inhabitants.

References

Populated places in Znojmo District
Market towns in the Czech Republic